Frederick William Barrett (born January 26, 1950) is a Canadian former professional ice hockey defenceman who played 745 games in the National Hockey League with the Minnesota North Stars and Los Angeles Kings between 1970 and 1984.

Career 
During his career in the NHL, Barrett played for the Minnesota North Stars and Los Angeles Kings. Barrett is the namesake of the Fred Barrett Arena in his hometown of Ottawa.

Personal life 
Barrett's brother, John, also played in the NHL. He is the brother-in-law of Quebec politician and author Rodrigue Tremblay.

Career statistics

Regular season and playoffs

References

External links 
 

1950 births
Living people
Canadian ice hockey defencemen
Cleveland Barons (1937–1973) players
Ice hockey people from Ottawa
Los Angeles Kings players
Minnesota North Stars draft picks
Minnesota North Stars players
Toronto Marlboros players